Rudolf Prikryl (21 March 1896 – 13 June 1965) was the provisionally-instated mayor of Vienna from 13 April to 16 April 1945, and is remembered as the "three days' mayor".

Prikryl was born in Vienna, grew up in Alsergrund, and became a plumber's assistant. He served in the First World War, and married for the first time, getting divorced soon after. In the 1930s, he left his second wife and their two children and travelled to France, continuing on to Spain in 1938. He fought in the International Brigade in the Spanish Civil War against the Nationalists, and was injured. There is no reliable information about his movements in the time thereafter.

At the end of the Second World War, he was back in Vienna, and was apparently recognised by a Soviet officer alongside whom he had fought in Spain. This chance meeting resulted in him being made mayor, although the exact reasoning remains unclear. Although being Vienna's only communist mayor, the Communist Party of Austria never acknowledged Prikryl as a member.

His time as mayor saw no practical policy decisions, instead concentrating on bureaucratic tasks, chiefly giving out permissions of various kinds. On 17 April he was replaced by Theodor Körner.

Prikryl later married again, and started a plumbing firm, which later went bankrupt. He died in Vienna in poverty, and was buried in a grave of honour in Vienna's Feuerhalle Simmering.

References 
Fischer, Karl: Phantom Prikryl. Die Person des Rudolf Prikryl, die Legende vom „Drei-Tage-Bürgermeister" und der Amtsantritt Theodor Körners als Wiener Bürgermeister, in: Studien zur Wiener Geschichte. Jahrbuch des Vereins für Geschichte der Stadt Wien, Volume 51. Vienna 1995

External links 
 www.datum.at - Portrait of Rudolf Prikryl in the magazine Datum
 www.wien.gv.at - Calendar of events in Vienna during April 1945

1896 births
1965 deaths
20th-century Austrian people
Mayors of Vienna
Austrian communists
Austrian people of Czech descent
Politicians from Vienna
People from Alsergrund
Burials at Feuerhalle Simmering
International Brigades personnel